The SABA Championship is a basketball tournament for national teams organized by the South Asia Basketball Association, a sub-zone of the FIBA Asia. It serves as a qualifier for various FIBA Asia events such as the FIBA Asia Championship and the FIBA Asia Cup.

Starting immediately at the end of the 2019 FIBA Basketball World Cup, a new qualification format for 2021 FIBA Asia Cup, and for every continental championships thereafter, has been introduced, wherein home and away games will be done during the pre-qualifiers in order to determine the participants for the main qualifiers that will battle for the 16 berths of the continental championships.

Summary

Medal table

See also 
 SABA Women's Championship
 SAFF Championship
 South Asian Games

References 

 
Basketball competitions in Asia between national teams
Sport in South Asia
2002 establishments in Asia
Recurring sporting events established in 2002